The community college system in Malaysia provides a wide range of Technical and Vocational Education Training (TVET) courses. Disciplines covered include accounting, architecture, construction, engineering, draughting, entrepreneurship, hospitality, personal services, multimedia, and visual arts.

Community colleges in Malaysia are administered by the Ministry of Education (MOE) via the Jabatan Pengajian Kolej Komuniti.

Community college offering four type of programmes:
 Sijil Kolej Komuniti
 Sijil Kemahiran Khas (masalah pembelajaran)
 Diploma secara Pembelajaran Berasaskan Kerja
 Pembelajaran Sepanjang Hayat (Kursus pendek)

Background
In 2000, the Government approved a proposal by the Ministry of Education (MOE) to establish a network of educational institutions whereby vocational and technical skills training could be provided at all levels for school leavers before they entered the workforce. The community colleges also provide an infrastructure for rural communities to gain skills training through short courses as well as providing access to a post-secondary education. This institutions became known as community colleges.

Since the establishment of the first 12 pioneer community colleges in 2001, the number of community colleges across all states in Malaysia with the exception of the Federal Territory, has risen to 91 (as per Oct 2014). Community colleges are synonymous with Technical and Vocational Education and Training (TVET) as they provide a multitude of programmes that are based on TVET at certificate and diploma levels.

Program offered
Community college offer 4 programmes which is;
 Sijil Kolej Komuniti
 The community college education system provides students with the opportunity of attending full-time and continuous programme for a duration of 3 semesters at community college. To fulfill the certificate, students are required to attend a 4–6 months' industrial training programme.
 Sijil Kemahiran Khas (masalah pembelajaran)
 The development of certificate for special skills is based on the needs of those with learning disabilities. The acquisition of knowledge and skills are important to empower them with a means to be more independent and capable of increasing their household incomes. This cert is in line with the need highlighted in the New Economic Model (Malaysia Policy) where the role of societal inclusiveness is emphasised.
 Diploma secara Pembelajaran Berasaskan Kerja
 Pembelajaran Sepanjang Hayat (Kursus pendek)
 Apart from offering full-time programmes, community college also offer short courses to fulfill the needs of the local communities. The aims are to inculcate interest, to motivate, to educate the community in Malaysia about lifelong learning and consequently to increase their standard of living through education.

Tuition fees and Financial assistance

Tuition fees for certificate level is standard to RM200.00 (MYR) per semester. For Certificate's student financial assistance is offered by The Ministry of Education to help them bear the financial cost of programmes.

Entry requirement
 Community College Certificate
 Malaysian citizen
 A pass in Sijil Pelajaran Malaysia
 Other requirements as stipulated by MQA (Malaysia Qualification Accreditation)
 Community College Certificate (Special Skills)
 Malaysian citizen
 Applicants must have completed form five (5) in a Special Education School or Special Education Integrated Programme under the preview of Ministry of Education, Malaysia

Community colleges by state
The original plan of the MOE called for the establishment of community colleges in every parliamentary constituency in Malaysia. Currently, community colleges have been established in the following locations:

Johor (7)
 Kolej Komuniti Bandar Penawar, Bandar Penawar
 Branch campus in Bandar Tenggara
 Kolej Komuniti Ledang, Tangkak
 Kolej Komuniti Pasir Gudang, Pasir Gudang
 Branch campus in Tanjung Piai, Pontian
 Kolej Komuniti Segamat, Segamat
 Kolej Komuniti Segamat 2, Batu Aman
 Kolej Komuniti Kluang, Taman Delima

Kedah (4)
 Kolej Komuniti Bandar Baharu, Bandar Baharu
 Kolej Komuniti Bandar Darulaman, Jitra
 Kolej Komuniti Kulim, Kulim
 Kolej Komuniti Sungai Petani, Sungai Petani
 Kolej Komuniti Langkawi, Langkawi

Malacca (4)
 Kolej Komuniti Masjid Tanah, Masjid Tanah,website, https://web.archive.org/web/20170922030409/http://kkmt.edu.my/
 Kolej Komuniti Bukit Beruang, Bukit Beruang
 Kolej Komuniti Jasin, Jasin
 Kolej Komuniti Selandar, Selandar

Negeri Sembilan (2)
 Kolej Komuniti Jelebu, Kuala Klawang
 Kolej Komuniti Jempol, Bahau
 Kolej Komuniti Rembau, Rembau
 Kolej Komuniti Tampin, Gemencheh
 Kolej Komuniti Kuala Pilah, Melang

Pahang (6)
 Kolej Komuniti Bentong, Karak
 Kolej Komuniti Kuantan, Kuantan
 Kolej Komuniti Mentakab, Temerloh
 Kolej Komuniti Paya Besar, Gambang
 Kolej Komuniti Rompin, Kuala Rompin
 Kolej Komuniti Cawangan Raub, Raub

Penang (6)
 Kolej Komuniti Bayan Baru, Air Itam
 Kolej Komuniti Kepala Batas, Kepala Batas
 Kolej Komuniti Bukit Mertajam, Tanah Liat
 Kolej Komuniti Nibong Tebal, Simpang Ampat
 Kolej Komuniti Tasek Gelugor, Teluk Air Tawar
 Kolej Komuniti Seberang Jaya, Seberang Jaya

Perak (6)
 Kolej Komuniti Chenderoh, Kuala Kangsar
 Kolej Komuniti Tapah, Tapah
 Kolej Komuniti Grik, Gerik
 Kolej Komuniti Pasir Salak, Kampung Gajah
 Kolej Komuniti Sungai Siput, Sungai Siput
 Kolej Komuniti Teluk Intan, Seri Manjung
 Kolej Komuniti Taiping, Kamunting
 Kolej komuniti Bagan Serai

Perlis (1)
 Kolej Komuniti Arau, Arau

Sabah (8)
 Kolej Komuniti Tawau, Tawau
 Kolej Komuniti Semporna, Semporna
 Kolej Komuniti Lahad Datu, Lahad Datu
 Kolej Komuniti Sandakan, Sandakan
 Kolej Komuniti Kota Marudu, Kota Marudu
 Kolej Komuniti Tambunan, Tambunan
 Kolej Komuniti Penampang, Penampang
 Kolej Komuniti Beaufort, Beaufort

Sarawak (1)
 Kolej Komuniti Kuching, Kuching

Selangor (5)
 Kolej Komuniti Hulu Langat, Kajang
 Kolej Komuniti Hulu Selangor, Batangkali
 Kolej Komuniti Kuala Langat, Kuala Langat
 Kolej Komuniti Sabak Bernam, Sabak Bernam
 Kolej Komuniti Selayang, Batu Caves

Terengganu (1)
 Kolej Komuniti Kuala Terengganu, Kuala Terengganu

See also
 Education in Malaysia
 Malaysian Qualifications Framework
 Vocational education

References

External links
 Community Colleges Management Sector
 Department of Skills Development, Ministry of Human Resources

Community colleges
Colleges in Malaysia
Vocational education in Malaysia
Vocational colleges in Malaysia